Karaman is a town in south central Turkey, the provincial capital of Karaman Province.

Karaman may also refer to:

People
 Aykut Karaman (born 1947), Turkish architect
 Karaman Bey (died 1261), founder of the Karamanids dynasty
 Hikmet Karaman (born 1960), Turkish football manager
 İlkan Karaman (born 1990), Turkish basketball player
 Ivo Karamanski (1959–1998), Bulgarian mobster
 Kenan Karaman (born 1994), Turkish football player
 Ljubo Karaman (1886–1971), Croatian art historian
 Sami Sabit Karaman (1877–1957), Turkish general
 Simay Karaman (born 1991), Turkish basketball player
 Stanko Karaman (1889–1959), Yugoslav biologist
 Ünal Karaman (born 1966), former Turkish footballer and manager

Places

 Karaman, a village in Azerbaijan
 Karaman, Çubuk, a village in Ankara Province, Turkey
 Karaman, Cyprus, a village in Cyprus
 Karaman Eyalet, administrative division of the Ottoman Empire
 Karaman, Kovancılar, a village in Turkey
 Karaman, Kurucaşile, a village in Bartın Province, Turkey
 Karaman Province, Turkey
 Karaman (electoral district), the province's electoral district in the Turkish parliament

Other uses 

 Karamanids, Anatolian beylik, centered in Anatolia
 Karamanlides, a Greek Orthodox Turkish-speaking ethnic group

See also
 Karamania, a region of Asia Minor (modern Turkey)
 Kahraman (disambiguation)
 Karamanlis (disambiguation)

Turkish-language surnames